Dawn Harper, may refer to:

Dawn Harper-Nelson - American athlete
Dawn Harper (doctor) - English celebrity doctor